Alastaro is a former municipality of Finland. It was merged into the town of Loimaa on 1 January 2009.

It is located in the province of Southern Finland and is part of the Southwest Finland region. The population density was 11.33 inhabitants per km².

The municipality was unilingually Finnish.

The Alastaro Circuit opened in 1990.

References

External links

 Alastaro-Seura ry 

Former municipalities of Finland
Loimaa
Populated places disestablished in 2009
2009 disestablishments in Finland